State was a station on the Englewood Branch of the Chicago 'L'. The station opened on November 3, 1905 and closed on September 2, 1973  as part of a group of budget-related CTA station closings.

References

External links
 State Station Page at Chicago-L.org

Railway stations in the United States opened in 1905
Railway stations closed in 1973
1905 establishments in Illinois
1973 disestablishments in Illinois
Defunct Chicago "L" stations